Roy Warhurst (18 September 1926 – 7 January 2014) was an English footballer who made more than 300 appearances in the Football League playing for Sheffield United, Birmingham City, Manchester City, Crewe Alexandra and Oldham Athletic. He played as a wing half.

Warhurst was born in Handsworth, Sheffield. He began his football career during the Second World War as a youth with Atlas & Norfolk Works before signing as an amateur with Huddersfield Town and Sheffield United, and turned professional with the latter in September 1944. His early career was as a winger, but after he joined Birmingham City for an £8,000 fee in 1950, he was converted to wing half. His forceful style contributed much to the club's Second Division title in the 1954–55 season and to their performances in the First Division and the FA Cup the following season. Warhurst injured a thigh in the sixth-round FA Cup match, and missed the rest of the season, and his absence was considered a significant factor in Birmingham's losing the 1956 Cup Final: teammate Alex Govan was convinced that "if Roy Warhurst had been fit then there would only have been one winner".

He succeeded Len Boyd as Birmingham captain at the end of that season, and 12 months later signed for Manchester City for a £10,000 fee. He spent 18 months at City before moving on to Crewe Alexandra and then to Oldham Athletic, where he was appointed captain. A spell in non-league football with Banbury Spencer preceded his retirement from the game in 1964.

Warhurst went on to become a scrap metal dealer. He was married to Jean and had three children. He died in January 2014 at the age of 87.

Honours 
Birmingham City
 Football League Second Division: 1954–55
 FA Cup runner-up: 1955–56

References

1926 births
2014 deaths
Footballers from Sheffield
English footballers
Association football wing halves
Sheffield United F.C. players
Birmingham City F.C. players
Manchester City F.C. players
Crewe Alexandra F.C. players
Oldham Athletic A.F.C. players
Banbury United F.C. players
English Football League players